The 8th South Indian International Movie Awards is an awards event held at Qatar on  15–16 August 2019. SIIMA 2019 recognized the best films and performances from the Telugu, Tamil, Malayalam and Kannada films and music released in 2018, along with special honors for lifetime contributions and a few special awards. The nomination list for the main awards was announced in July 2019.

Honorary awards 
 Suresh Kumar & Menaka Sureshkumar (Lifetime Achievement Award)

Main awards

Film

Acting

Debut awards 
{| class="wikitable" |
|-
! colspan="2" ! style="background:#eedd82; width:3000px; text-align:center;"|SIIMA Award for Best Debut Actor
|-
! ! style="background:#efac00; width:50%; text-align:center;"|Telugu
! ! style="background:#efeb00; width:50%; text-align:center;"|Tamil
|-
| valign="top" |
Kalyaan Dhev – Vijetha
Aashish Gandhi – Natakam
Rahul Vijay – Ee Maaya Peremito
Srinivasa Sayee – Subhalekha + Lu
Sumanth Sailendra – Brand Babu

| valign="top" |
 Dinesh – Oru Kuppa Kathai
 Adhithya Bhaskar – 96
 Anthony – Merku Thodarchi Malai
 Darshan – Kanaa
 Saravanan – Raatchasan
|-
! ! style="background:#00def3; text-align:center;"| Kannada
! ! style="background:#4df300; text-align:center;"| Malayalam
|-
|
Danish Sait – Humble Politician Nograj
Naveen Shankar – Gultoo
Niranjan Sudhindra – Second Half
Prakyath Paramesh – Naduve Antharavirali
Vaibhav – Tharakasura

|
Pranav Mohanlal – Aadhi
Bibin George – Oru Pazhaya Bomb Kadha
Druvan Druv – Queen
Kalidas Jayaram – Poomaram
Senthil Krishna – Chalakkudykkaran Changathy

|-
! colspan="2" ! style="background:#eedd82; text-align:center;"|SIIMA Award for Best Debut Actress
|-
! ! style="background:#efac00; text-align:center;"|Telugu
! ! style="background:#efeb00; text-align:center;"|Tamil
|-
| valign="top" |
Payal Rajput – RX 100
Ashima Narwal – Natakam
Kiara Advani – Bharat Ane Nenu
Nabha Natesh – Nannu Dochukunduvate
Nidhi Agerwal – Savyasachi
Ruhani Sharma – Chi La Sow

| valign="top" |
 Raiza Wilson – Pyaar Prema Kaadhal
 Amritha Aiyer – Padaiveeran
 Ditya – Lakshmi
 Gouri G. Kishan – 96
 Ivana – Naachiyaar
|-
! ! style="background:#00def3; text-align:center;"| Kannada
! ! style="background:#4df300; text-align:center;"| Malayalam
|-
|
Anupama Gowda – Aa Karaala Ratri
Aishwarya Arjun – Prema Baraha
Nishvika Naidu – Amma I Love You
Sonal Monteiro – Abhisaarike
Sonika Gowda – Shathaya Gathaya
Srinidhi Shetty – K.G.F: Chapter 1
|
Saniya Iyappan  – QueenDevika Sanjay – Njan Prakashan
Neeta Pillai – Poomaram
Saranya R. Nair – Maradona
Surabhi Santhosh – Kuttanadan Marpappa

|-

! colspan="2" ! style="background:#eedd82; text-align:center;"|SIIMA Award for Best Debut Director
|-
! ! style="background:#efac00; text-align:center;"|Telugu
! ! style="background:#efeb00; text-align:center;"|Tamil
|-
| valign="top" |Ajay Bhupathi – RX 100Rahul Ravindran – Chi La Sow
Venky Atluri – Tholi Prema
Venky Kudumula – Chalo
Venu Udugula – Needi Naadi Oke Katha

| valign="top" |
 Nelson – Kolamavu Kokila Arunraja Kamaraj – Kanaa
 C. Premkumar – 96
 Lenin Bharathi – Merku Thodarchi Malai
 Mari Selvaraj – Pariyerum Perumal

|-
! ! style="background:#00def3; text-align:center;"| Kannada
! ! style="background:#4df300; text-align:center;"| Malayalam
|-
|S. Mahesh Kumar – AyogyaJanardhan Chikkanna – Gultoo
Raveen Kumara – Naduve Antaravirali
Saad Khan – Humble Politician Nograj
Senna Hegde – Katheyondu Shuruvagide

|Zakariya  – Sudani from Nigeria'Dijo Jose Anthony – QueenPrajesh Sen – CaptainRathish Ambat – Kammara SambhavamVa Shrikumar Menon – Odiyan|}

 Music 

 Technical awards 

 Best Art Director – Sabbani Rama Krishna for Rangasthalam Critics' choice awards 
Telugu cinema
Best Actor – Vijay Deverakonda – Geetha GovindamBest Actress – Samantha Akkineni – RangasthalamTamil Cinema
Best Actor – Jayam Ravi – Adanga Maru
Best Actress – Aishwarya Rajesh – KanaaKannada cinema
Best Actor – Yash – K.G.F Chapter – 1
Best Actress – Manvitha Harish – TagaruMalayalam cinema
Best Actor – Nivin Pauly – Hey JudeBest Actress – Trisha – Hey Jude Special Jury Awards 

Special Appreciation Jury Award : Sudheer Babu – SammohanamSpecial Jury for Outstanding performance : Kathir – Pariyerum PerumalSpecial Jury for Child Artist (Tamil) : Master Aarav Ravi – Tik Tik Tik''

Generation Next Awards 

Entertainer of the Year : TBA
Generation Next Superstar : TBA
Most Popular Star in the Middle East : Mohanlal
Popular Celebrity on Social Media : Vijay Devarakonda
Style Icon of the Year : Yash and Samantha Akkineni

Presenters

References

External links 
 Official website 

South Indian International Movie Awards
2019 Indian film awards